Ronggeng is a type of Javanese dance in which couples exchange poetic verses as they dance to the music of a rebab or violin and a gong. Ronggeng might have originated from Java in Indonesia.

Ronggeng probably has existed in Java since ancient time, the bas reliefs in Karmawibhanga section on eighth century Borobudur displays the scene of travelling entertainment troupe with musicians and female dancers. In Java, a traditional ronggeng performance features a traveling dance troupe that travels from village to village. The dance troop consists of one or several professional female dancers, accompanied by a group of musicians playing musical instruments: rebab and gong. The term "ronggeng" also applied for this female dancers. During a ronggeng performance, the female professional dancers are expected to invite some male audiences or clients to dance with them as a couple with the exchange of some tips money for the female dancer, given during or after the dance. The couple dances intimately and the female dancer might perform some movements that might be considered too erotic by standard of modesty in Javanese court etiquette. In the past, the erotic and sexual nuance of the dance gave ronggeng a shady reputation as prostitution disguised in the art of dance.

Ronggeng is the main theme of Ahmad Tohari's novel Ronggeng Dukuh Paruk, which tells the story of a dancer girl who is also a prostitute, in a remote village in Central Java. Ronggeng is closely related to Sundanese Jaipongan dance.

See also

 Gamelan
 Javanese culture
 Dance in Indonesia

References

Dances of Indonesia
Dances of Java
Malay dances
Malay culture